Nimród E. Antal (born November 30, 1973) is a Hungarian-American film director, screenwriter and actor.

Life and career
Antal was born in Los Angeles, California, to parents of Hungarian descent. In 1991, following his father's advice, Antal moved to Hungary to study at the Hungarian Film Academy. After graduating he began work in the film and television industry; in 2005, he returned to Los Angeles and continued to work in the film and television industry in Hollywood.

Directing
Antal wrote and directed the Hungarian-language film Kontroll (2003), which won numerous awards, including the Award of the Youth at the 2004 Cannes Film Festival and the main prize at the Chicago International Film Festival, as well as a European Film Award nomination for Best Director and being selected as Hungary's submission to the Academy Award for Best Foreign Language Film. The backdrop of the film is the Budapest Metro subway system. Kontroll, refers to the act of ticket inspectors checking to ensure a rider has paid their fare.

Antal's first American feature film, Vacancy, starring Kate Beckinsale and Luke Wilson, was released on April 20, 2007. His second American film, Armored, was released in December 2009. Robert Rodriguez hired him to direct the film Predators. He directed the Metallica 3D concert movie/narrative story titled: Metallica Through the Never (2013).

Antal began shooting a biopic about infamous Hungarian bank robber Attila Ambrus in 2016; the film, called A Viszkis, was released in 2017.

Antal has directed for three television series, two of which were executive produced by M. Night Shyamalan  - first, as a guest director on Wayward Pines, then as a regular director for Servant. In 2022 he directed two episodes of Stranger Things season 4.

Acting
Antal has appeared in acting roles in some Hungarian films, the most known among these are András Salamons Közel a szerelemhez (1999) and Balra a nap nyugszik (2000), directed by András Fésös. Antal had major supporting parts in both of these films. He also had a cameo in Robert Rodriguez's 2010 film Machete.

FilmographyFilmKontroll (2003)
Vacancy (2007)
Armored (2009)
Predators (2010)
Metallica: Through the Never (2013)
The Whiskey Bandit (2017)
Retribution (TBA)Television'

References

External links

Nimród Antal on IGN

1973 births
American people of Hungarian descent
Hungarian film directors
Living people
Science fiction film directors
American male screenwriters
Film directors from Los Angeles
Screenwriters from California
Horror film directors
Action film directors